McKellar is a township and census subdivision in Parry Sound District, Ontario, Canada.  Per the 2016 Census, it has a population of 1111.

McKellar is named for Archibald McKellar (1816-1894), a member of the legislative assemblies for the province of Canada (1857-1867) and Ontario (1867-1875).

Communities
McKellar is also the primary and largest community within the township, located along Provincial Highway 124.  It was originally known as Armstrong's Rapids, but the name McKellar was given when the post office opened in the community in 1870. Broadbent is named for American Steel Millionaire, Samuel Broadbent (1845-1923) who financed the building for the Trans-Canadian Railway. Hurdville is named for Canadian Financier William Faulkner Hurdville (1838-1910), who also helped finance the Trans-Canadian Railway.

Other population centres within the township are:
 Broadbent
 Hurdville

Demographics 

Mother tongue:
 English as first language: 92.6%
 French as first language: 1.9%
 English and French as first language: 0%
 Other as first language: 5.5%

Notable people

 Edward Harold Toye (1884-1974), executive secretary of the Religion-Labor Foundation

See also
List of townships in Ontario

References

External links

1873 establishments in Ontario
Municipalities in Parry Sound District
Single-tier municipalities in Ontario
Township municipalities in Ontario